June Barrows Mussey (March 30, 1910 – July 27, 1985), who wrote under the pen name Henry Hay, was an American journalist and translator who is notable for his writing about magic and sleight of hand and also of a large number of European authors including Lion Feuchtwanger.

He also was one of the anonymous translators of Hitler's Mein Kampf (1925–26) for an American edition by the publisher Stackpole Sons. Stackpole advertised that it paid "no royalties to Hitler" and later played up the fact that the publisher was donating a percentage of the proceeds to refugee relief. 12,000 copies were printed but Stackpole had to stop selling because of a legal battle with the publisher Houghton, Mifflin  who had bought the American rights.

Mussey was born in New York and lived in West Germany after World War II. He was a friend of the famous coin manipulator Thomas Nelson Downs. His highly regarded The Amateur Magician's Handbook (1950) has gone through several editions and is still considered a standard reference work among magicians.

Publications

Magic (1942) as Barrows Mussey
Learn Magic (1947) as Barrows Mussey
Roll back the sea (1947, translator), as Barrows Mussey. The first English language edition of Het verjaagde water by A. den Doolaard.
Mein Kampf: The First Complete and Unexpurgated Edition Published in the English Language by Adolf Hitler. Translated anonymously. Stackpole Sons, 1939.  
Cyclopedia of Magic (1949)
The Amateur Magician's Handbook (1950)
"The Devil in Boston: A Play about the Salem Witchcraft Trials in Three Acts (1948)" by Lion Feuchtwanger, translated by J. Barrows Mussey (ebook 2015)

References

Further reading

Regina Range, Mary Bryant, and Waltraud Maierhofer, "J. Barrows Mussey and his Translation of Feuchtwanger's Wahn oder Der Teufel in Boston," Feuchtwanger and Remigration. Edited by Ian Wallace. (Feuchtwanger Studies 3.) Peter Lang, 2013. 67-81. .
http://www.geniimagazine.com/wiki/index.php/Henry_Hay

1910 births
1985 deaths
20th-century American non-fiction writers
American magicians
American expatriates in West Germany
Journalists from New York (state)
20th-century American journalists
American male journalists
20th-century American male writers